Jasmine Nwajei (born 2 February 1995) is a Nigerian basketball player for First Bank BC and the Nigerian national team.

She represented Nigeria at the 2019 Women's Afrobasket.

Wagner and Syracuse statistics 

Source

References

1995 births
Living people
Shooting guards
Nigerian women's basketball players
Syracuse Orange women's basketball players